Ralph Desmond Rose (2 February 1943 - 14 October 1992) was an Australian rules footballer who played with Collingwood in the Victorian Football League (VFL).

Rose, a Nyah West recruit, appeared in the opening 16 rounds of the 1962 VFL season. The centre half-forward played a further nine games in 1963.

He is the youngest of the four Rose brothers who played for Collingwood, Bill, Bob and Kevin.

In 1964 he accepted an offer to captain-coach Wycheproof-Narraport and in 1967 he joined Maryborough as playing coach. He continued to coach clubs into the 1970s, including Avenal.

References

1943 births
Australian rules footballers from Victoria (Australia)
Collingwood Football Club players
Maryborough Football Club players
1992 deaths